Dale Stevenson (born 1 January 1988) is an Australian athlete. He competed for Australia in shot-put at the 2012 Summer Olympics. He is coached by Gus Puopolo.

Personal life
Dale attended the Peninsula School, a Mount Eliza-based primary and secondary school.

Achievements

References

External links

Australian male shot putters
Athletes (track and field) at the 2012 Summer Olympics
Athletes (track and field) at the 2010 Commonwealth Games
Olympic athletes of Australia
Commonwealth Games medallists in athletics
1988 births
Living people
Commonwealth Games bronze medallists for Australia
People from Wonthaggi
Sportsmen from Victoria (Australia)
Medallists at the 2010 Commonwealth Games